The following elections occurred in the year 1858.

North America

United States
 California's At-large congressional district
 Lincoln–Douglas debates of 1858
 1858 New York state election
 1858 United States House of Representatives elections
 1858 United States Senate elections

See also
 :Category:1858 elections

1858
Elections